Otto Daniel Livonius (1 April 1829 – 9 February 1917) was a Vizeadmiral (Vice Admiral) of the German Imperial Navy, serving in the predecessor Prussian Navy and the Navy of the North German Confederation.

Family and early life 

Livonius was born 1 April 1829 in Wolgast in the Prussian province Pomerania. His father was Daniel Livonius a captain and postmaster in the Kingdom of Prussia. His brother Wilhelm Livonius became a general and was ennobled in 1888.

Livonius left school 1848 in Berlin in order to start sea travelling. After six months on the sailing ship Washington, he became a naval cadet in the Prussian Navy.
Livonius was married with Louise Radmann.

Naval career 

Livonius became a naval cadet, on 7 December 1848 in Stettin. He attended Stettin Naval School.

During the Second Schleswig War 1864 he was Kapitänleutnant and First Officer on the Prussian frigate . At the naval action off Jasmund (Isle of Rügen) on 17 March 1864, he was wounded and conferred with the Order of the Red Eagle.
In 1866 Prussia became part of the North German Confederation, the navy officially became that of the confederation and Livonius joined the new institution.

During the Franco-Prussian War of 1870–71 he commanded the warship . At the outbreak of the war Arminius was stationed in Kiel, but Captain Livonius managed to break through the French blockade by hugging the Swedish coast. The passage through Swedish territorial waters protected the ship from French attack. In the course of the war, Livonius sortied from the port over forty times, but failed to result in major combat, though he occasionally traded shots with the blockading French warships.
Unification of Germany in 1871 again meant a change of name, to the German Imperial Navy. From 1872 to 1875 he commanded the armored frigate . On 2 May 1874 Livonius was promoted to captain (Kapitän zur See).

In 1875/76 Livonius was commanding officer of the German East Asia Squadron and commanded the warship .

From 1877 to 1881 Livonius became director of the Imperial Shipyard Danzig. On 15 February 1881 Livonius was promoted to rear admiral (Konteradmiral). As of 13 December 1881 Livonius was a director with the German Imperial Admiralty where he served until 27 December 1883, when he was promoted to Vice Admiral (Vizeadmiral). On 2 February 1884, he was transferred to the retired list.

He died on 9 February 1917, aged 87, in Berlin.

Honors 
Order of the Red Eagle

Works 

 Die Marine des Norddeutschen Bundes, ihre Bedeutung und ihre bisherige Entwicklung nebst einer erläuternden Angabe aller gesetzlichen Bestimmungen über die Aufnahme in den Dienst der königlichen Marine und der Aussichten der Aufgenommenen. Liebrecht, Berlin 1869. 
 Unsere Flotte im deutsch-französischen Kriege. Mittler & Sohn, Berlin 1871.
 Colonialfrage. Berlin 1900. 68 S.
 Über die Vorrichtungen zur Rettung von Menschenleben bei See-Unfällen. Berlin 1900.

References

Vice admirals of the Imperial German Navy
Prussian naval officers
German military personnel of the Franco-Prussian War
1829 births
1917 deaths
Military personnel from Mecklenburg-Western Pomerania